Sabir or Sabbir Khan may refer to:

 Sabir Khan (musician), Indian sarangi player
 Sabbir Khan (Bangladeshi cricketer) (born 1978), Bangladeshi cricketer
 Sabir Khan (Indian cricketer) (born 2000), Indian cricketer
 Sabbir Khan (born 1976), Indian film director
 Shabbir Khan (born 1997), Indian cricketer

See also
Sabri Khan (1927–2015)